Apollonides of Sparta was appointed in 181 BCE as one of the treasurers to check the system of squandering the public money which had been carried on for some time by Chaeron, a low demagogue. As Apollonides was the person whom Chaeron had most to fear, he had him assassinated by his emissaries.

Notes

2nd-century BC Spartans
Ancient Greeks who were murdered